Theodore J. "Ted" Falk  (born May 23, 1960) is a Canadian politician, who currently represents the electoral district of Provencher in the House of Commons of Canada. A member of the Conservative Party of Canada, he was first elected in a by-election on November 25, 2013.

Early life and career

Prior to his election, Falk was the owner of a construction and gravel-crushing company and also served as president of the volunteer board of the Steinbach Credit Union (SCU).

Falk was first elected in as Member of Parliament in the 2013 Provencher by-election, succeeding former cabinet minister Vic Toews, who had retired from politics three months earlier after almost 13 years as the area's MP. Falk was re-elected in the 2015, 2019, and 2021 federal elections.

He is considered both a fiscal and social conservative, often taking positions, such as his anti-abortion stance, in contrast to his party's official position. In 2016, prior to Steinbach's first Steinbach Pride event Falk claimed a conflict in his schedule with the Frog Follies festival in St-Pierre-Jolys, but when Follies organizers publicly asked him to attend Steinbach Pride instead, Falk said he would not attend because of “values of faith, family and community.”

In 2021, during the Covid 19 pandemic, Falk stated he opposes mandatory vaccines and vaccine requirements to enter businesses. He made erroneous statements about Covid vaccines, falsely claiming that vaccines are more dangerous than the Delta variant. He retracted these statements and emphasized the safety and importance of vaccines for Canadians. He refused to disclose his vaccine status and did not enter Parliament while there was a vaccine mandate, instead attending the House meetings virtually.

Electoral record

References

External links

1960 births
Living people
Conservative Party of Canada MPs
Members of the House of Commons of Canada from Manitoba
People from Steinbach, Manitoba
Politicians from Winnipeg
21st-century Canadian politicians
Canadian Mennonites